On September 29, 2016, an NJ Transit commuter train crashed at Hoboken Terminal in Hoboken, New Jersey. The accident occurred during the morning rush hour, at one of the busiest transportation hubs in the New York metropolitan area. The events leading up to the crash remain unclear but are currently being investigated. One person died, and 114 others were injured. The train operator, who was in the cab car, was among the injured.

Upstate New York Hazardous Materials Warning incident
The quote from the Dr. Seuss book Green Eggs and Ham "Would you. Could you. On a train?" was unexpectedly used on a misinformed Emergency Alert System activation targeting viewers in Upstate New York shortly before the train crash in Hoboken, New Jersey on September 27, 2016. The quote was used on a Hazardous Materials Warning message that was accidentally activated on Utica's NBC television station WKTV during an evening newscast:
 Civil authorities have issued a Hazardous Materials Warning for The United States. Effective until September 29, 02:16 AM EDT. Would you. Could you. On a Train? Wait for further instructions.

Background
NJ Transit is the third-busiest commuter railroad in the United States. Before the 2016 crash, the last fatal incident on the railroad was the 1996 Secaucus train collision.

NJ Transit had been under audit by the Federal Railroad Administration since June 2016, before the crash. The probe was prompted by an increase in safety violations and led to federal citations of the agency.

Accident

Pascack Valley Line train #1614 left the Spring Valley station in Spring Valley, New York, at 7:23 a.m. EDT, bound for Hoboken. Entering the Hoboken terminal around 8:45 a.m., the train went over the bumper block and through the rail concourse, coming to rest at the wall right before the station's waiting area. The cab car sustained major structural damage.

One witness reported that the train "never slowed down" as it entered the station, which is located at the end of the line.

The train involved in the crash reportedly did not have an automatic brake system using positive train control (PTC), which is used to slow the train in case the engineer does not apply the brake in time. It is unclear whether PTC would have prevented the crash.

Train #1614 consisted of four NJ Transit Comet V passenger cars (cab car #6036 and 3 coaches) and one NJT GP40PH-2B locomotive (#4214). Train #1614 was a local, making all stops on the Pascack Valley Line. Comet V Cab Car #6036 was leading the train at the time of the accident, with locomotive #4214 pushing from the rear.

Casualties

The accident caused one death and injured at least 114 other people. The Jersey City Medical Center treated 66 people for injuries from the crash; 53 of these were released from the hospital by the afternoon following the crash. The Hoboken University Medical Center treated 23 patients and the Christ Hospital treated one patient; of these all but two were released by the evening following the crash.

The lone fatality, a woman standing on the platform, was killed by falling debris. The victim was identified as attorney Fabiola Bittar de Kroon, 34, a married mother of one and native of Brazil who had recently moved to Hoboken. The majority of those injured were passengers on the crashed train.

Impact

Initial eyewitness reports indicated that portions of the station roof collapsed, as did part of the roof of the train shed, and that water was spraying from the site of the accident. Major structural damage to the station was reported.

Following the accident, rail service to and from the Hoboken station (including PATH service) was suspended, and local buses and ferries, as well as Metro-North Railroad, were cross-honoring NJ Transit train tickets. PATH service was suspended due to fears that the roof of the PATH station, where the derailed NJ Transit train came to rest, might collapse. PATH service into and out of the station was restored by the end of the day, as was Hudson-Bergen Light Rail service in and out of the station. Delays to rail service in the area persisted into the following week.

Investigation

The National Transportation Safety Board (NTSB) is investigating the accident. An NTSB "go team" was sent to the scene, and the Federal Railroad Administration also dispatched investigators. Although injured, the train engineer cooperated with the investigation, and both the engineer and the train conductor were interviewed by investigators. The engineer lacked any memory of the accident itself. According to the federal investigators, the engineer "felt well rested and was unaware of any mechanical problems in the moments before the accident."

Among other things, the NTSB investigation will attempt to determine whether or not positive train control could have prevented the accident.

The day following the crash, investigators retrieved one of the two train event recorders (black boxes) from the wreckage, but it was unusable. The second black box was successfully recovered in the first week of October 2016.

On October 6, 2016, the NTSB released its findings based on the event recorder and video recorders. According to its report, 38 seconds prior to the crash, the train's engineer accelerated from 8 mph and was traveling at 21 mph on impact, more than twice the speed limit of 10 mph. The engineer attempted the emergency braking procedure less than a second before the crash.

On October 6, 2016, the train was removed from the station area for further investigation.

In November 2016, attorney Jack Arsenault said his client, the train engineer Thomas Gallagher, suffered from severe sleep apnea which was undiagnosed until after the crash.  NJ Transit has a sleep apnea screening program but, despite that, a physical exam in July 2016 had cleared Gallagher for duty. Gallagher, aged 48 and with 18 years experience as a train engineer, said he had no memory of the crash and was lying on the cab floor when he woke up after the impact. An official briefed on the investigation told The Associated Press under condition of anonymity that the investigation is considering sleep apnea as a possible cause of the crash.

Hoboken Terminal has the original steel-and-concrete bumpers from when it was opened in 1907. It is believed newer bumpers with hydraulic shock absorbers and sled-like friction shoes would have reduced the impact.

Aftermath
Following the train crash, New Jersey Transit issued new regulations requiring that engineers must be accompanied by at least one other crew member as they pull a train into Hoboken Station. In addition NJ Transit also mandated a reduction in the approaching speed limit into the train station from 10 miles per hour to 5 miles per hour. The Hoboken Terminal remained closed until October 10, when Tracks 10 through 17 were reopened with a modified service schedule. Full service was not restored until October 17; Tracks 5 and 6, where the train crashed, remained closed while repairs were carried out. The pedestrian concourse reopened on May 14, 2017. Track 6 reopened for service in June 2017 and track 5 reopened for service sometime around September 2018. The planning for permanent repairs to the concourse roof and supports were ongoing during this time. In a February 2019 statement, NJ Transit stated that permanent repairs and renovations will begin in March and last for approximately one year. In April 2019, NJ transit stated that all repairs would be completed by the end of 2019, which they succeeded in doing.

Similar accidents
A similar accident occurred at the same station in December 1985, injuring 54 people. The 1985 crash was said to have been caused by a lubricant that had been applied to the tracks to test train wheels. In May 2011, a PATH train crashed in the basement of Hoboken Terminal, causing minor injuries. Investigators said that they will look into the possibility that the 2011 and 2016 accidents may have similar causes and circumstances. The December 2013 Spuyten Duyvil derailment was attributed to sleep apnea, which is a suspected factor in the 2016 Hoboken crash.

See also

List of American railroad accidents
List of rail accidents (2010–present)

Other accidents where engineers had sleep problems:
2008 Massachusetts train collision, commuter rail crash also blamed (posthumously) on the engineer's undiagnosed sleep apnea
Bourne End rail crash, British accident where a sleep-challenged engineer may have lost attention going into a curve.
Redondo Junction train wreck, deadliest rail accident in Los Angeles history; engineer said he "blacked out" beforehand

References

External links 

 Crash of NJ Transit commuter train, Hoboken, NJ - NTSB

2016 in New Jersey
Hoboken, New Jersey
NJ Transit Rail Operations
Railway accidents in 2016
Railway accidents and incidents in New Jersey
September 2016 events in the United States